The ETR Big Island Bridge is a Pratt through truss bridge located near Green River, Wyoming, which carries Sweetwater County Road CN4-4 across the Green River. The bridge was built from 1909 to 1910 by contractor Charles G. Sheely. It was named the Big Island Bridge after the Big Island region of Wyoming, which the bridge connected to other parts of the state.

The bridge was added to the National Register of Historic Places on February 22, 1985. It was one of several bridges added to the NRHP for their role in the history of Wyoming bridge construction.

See also
List of bridges documented by the Historic American Engineering Record in Wyoming

References

External links

 http://bridgehunter.com/wy/sweetwater/big-island/

Road bridges on the National Register of Historic Places in Wyoming
Bridges completed in 1910
Buildings and structures in Sweetwater County, Wyoming
Historic American Engineering Record in Wyoming
National Register of Historic Places in Sweetwater County, Wyoming
Pratt truss bridges in the United States